Cuyo may refer to:
 Cuyo (Argentina)
 Cuyo Province, historic, Argentina
 Cuyo, Palawan, Philippines
 Cuyo Airport, Philippines
 Cuyo Archipelago, Philippines
 1917 Cuyo, an Amor asteroid

See also
 Cuy (disambiguation)